The 1990 National League was the 16th since its establishment as a second tier in 1975, a renamed British League Division Two, and the last before it was again renamed British League Division Two.

Summary
The league was initially supposed to run with 18 teams - however, Mildenhall Fen Tigers were unable to form a team to the 42-point minimum average limit, and were expelled on March 22, 1990. Matches were once again run over a 16-heat formula, with seven riders per team.

Poole Pirates were again champions, and stepped up into British League Division One for the 1991 season.

League table

M = Meetings; W = Wins; D = Draws; L = Losses; F = Race points for; A = Race points against; Pts = Total Points

National League Knockout Cup
The 1990 National League Knockout Cup was the 23rd edition of the Knockout Cup for tier two teams. Poole Pirates were the winners of the competition.

First round

Second round

Quarter-finals

Semi-finals

Final
First leg

Second leg

Poole were declared Knockout Cup Champions, winning on aggregate 107–85.

Final leading averages
The top ten rider averages in the National League as of October 31, 1990:

Riders & final averages
Arena Essex

Martin Goodwin 8.85
Rob Tilbury 8.09
Wayne Garratt 5.77
Troy Pratt 5.65
Kevin Brice 4.95
Adrian Stevens 4.48
Simon Wolstenholme 4.31
Kevin Teager 3.88
Robert Ledwith 2.86

Berwick

Mark Courtney 8.67
David Walsh 8.62
David Blackburn 7.87
Andy Campbell 6.39
Alan Rivett 6.04
Rob Grant Sr. 5.89
Scott Robson 5.77
Kevin Little 3.80
Steve Widt 3.47

Eastbourne

Gordon Kennett 8.94 
Andy Buck 6.99
Tony Primmer 6.49
Paul Woods 6.24
Darren Standing 5.76
Brian Nixon 5.52
Keith Pritchard 5.52
Justin Walker 4.82
Darren Grayling 4.12

Edinburgh

Les Collins 8.76
Frede Schott 7.81
Carl Blackbird 7.14 
Brett Saunders 6.98 
Michael Coles 6.09
Scott Lamb 5.59
Mick Powell 4.02
Nigel Alderton 2.75

Exeter

Steve Regeling 10.20
Peter Jeffery 7.71
Richard Green 7.68
Colin Cook 6.61 
Andy Sell 5.73
Steve Bishop 5.19
Mark Simmonds 4.79
Ian Barney 3.86

Glasgow

Steve Lawson  8.83
Kenny McKinna 8.54
Shane Bowes 8.42
Charlie McKinna 6.68
Sean Courtney 6.58
Phil Jeffrey 5.87
Jason Lyons 5.79 
Geoff Powell 3.57
Martin McKinna 3.04

Hackney

Steve Schofield .10.51
Andy Galvin 9.27
Paul Whittaker 8.18
Gary Tagg 5.96
Michael Warren 5.45
Dave Hamnett 4.41
Tim Korneliussen 3.96
Shawn Venables 3.80
Ian Humphreys 2.91

Ipswich

Chris Louis 10.18 
David Norris 8.30
Dean Standing 8.02
Alan Mogridge 7.81 
Shane Parker 6.45
Robbie Fuller 5.07
Colin White 2.53
Craig Hyde 2.47

Long Eaton

Richard Hellsen 8.43
Nigel De'ath 6.91
Kevin Smart 6.03
Paul Fry 6.02
Jon Surman 4.63
Gary O'Hare 4.60
Peter Lloyd 4.20

Middlesbrough
 
Rod Hunter 9.93 
Darren Sumner 8.62 
David Cheshire 7.42
Jamie Luckhurst .7.36
Steve Wilcock 7.32
Paul Bentley 7.26
Duncan Chapman 3.62
Dave Edwards 3.41

Milton Keynes

Peter Glanz 7.24
Jonathan Cooper 6.00
Mark Blackbird 5.52
David Clarke 5.47
Trevor Banks 5.45
Mark Lyndon 5.33
Andy Hines 5.03
Rob Woffinden 4.59
Thierry Hilaire 3.68

Newcastle

David Bargh 9.72
Peter Carr 8.35
Martin Dixon 7.40
Simon Green 5.97
Mark Thorpe 5.37
Ian Stead 4.42
Paul Smith 3.95
Spencer Timmo 2.60
John Wainwright 2.46

Peterborough

Mick Poole 9.58
Craig Hodgson 8.04
Frank Andersen 7.83
Scott Norman 6.91
Ian Barney 6.72
Nigel Flatman 5.77
Mark Lyndon 4.46
Wayne Bridgeford 3.70
Sean Barker 2.98

Poole

Craig Boyce 10.44
Tom Knudsen 8.72
Alun Rossiter 8.64
Tony Langdon 8.23
Gary Allan 7.51
Gary Chessell 6.87
Rod Colquhoun 5.73
Steve Langdon 4.38

Rye House

Jens Rasmussen 9.36
Melvyn Taylor 8.86
Glen Baxter 7.70
Roger Johns 6.08
Jamie Fagg 5.71
Trevor O'Brien 5.39
Scott Humphries 4.69
Wayne Baxter 3.56
Nigel Sparshott 3.14
Kelvin Mullarkey 2.81
Wayne Bridgeford 2.62
Linden Warner 2.26

Stoke

Eric Monaghan 9.00
Nigel Crabtree 8.78
Louis Carr 8.28
Chris Cobby 5.74
Mark Pearce 4.83
Rob Woffinden 4.61
David Clarke 4.00
Mark Carlson 1.88
Richard Davidson 1.88

Wimbledon

Andy Grahame 9.40
Nathan Simpson 8.00
Ray Morton 7.52
Neville Tatum 7.38
Nigel Leaver 5.41
Pete Chapman 4.99
Deon Prinsloo 3.48
Justin Pryor 3.34

See also
 Speedway in the United Kingdom
 List of United Kingdom Speedway League Champions

References

Speedway British League Division Two / National League